Jacob Kuhangua was a Namibian politician, founding member of SWAPO. Kuhangua was Secretary-General of South West Africa People Organization (SWAPO),and petitioner to the United Nations on the issue of Namibian independence, and was a high-ranking administrator in South-West Africa prior to Namibian independence.

References

SWAPO politicians